2007–08 Bosnia and Herzegovina Football Cup was the fourteenth season of the Bosnia and Herzegovina's annual football cup, and an eighth season of the unified competition. The competition started on 24 October 2007 with the First Round and concluded on 4 June 2008 with the Final.

First round
Thirty-two teams entered in the First Round. The matches were played on 24 and 30 October 2007.

|}

Second round
The 16 winners from the prior round enter this round. The first legs were played on 7 November and the second legs were played on 27 and 28 November 2007.
 

|}

Quarterfinals
The eight winners from the prior round enter this round. The first legs were played on 5 and 12 March and the second legs were played on 19 March 2008.

|}

Semifinals
The four winners from the prior round enter this round. The first legs will be played on 9 April and the second legs were played on 23 April 2008.

|}

Final

First leg

Second leg

Zrinjski 3–3 Sloboda on aggregate. Zrinjski won 4–1 on penalties.

See also
 2007–08 Premier League of Bosnia and Herzegovina

External links
Statistics on RSSSF

Bosnia and Herzegovina Football Cup seasons
Cup
Bosnia